= Edward Carl Thaden =

American historian

- Born: April 24, 1922; Seattle, Washington
- Died: July 9, 2008 (aged 86); Seattle, Washington
- Education: University of Washington
- Occupation: Historian
- Scientific career
- Fields: Historian
- Workplaces: Penn State University

Edward Carl Thaden (April 24, 1922 - July 9, 2008) was an American historian, bestselling author and university professor.

== Life ==
Thaden was born in Seattle, Washington on April 24, 1922. He was married to Marianna Forster Thaden. He died on July 9, 2008, in Seattle, Washington, after having succumbed to prostate cancer. Marianna Thaden died in 2011. The Edward and Marianna Thaden Chair in Russian and East European Intellectual History at the University of Illinois Chicago College of Liberal Arts and Sciences was established in 2012.

== Education ==
He majored in Slavic Studies at the University of Washington where he received his bachelor’s degree.

== Career ==
He began his teaching career at the Penn State University in 1952.

He also served as a visiting professor at the University of Marburg (1965), University of Halle (1988), and the University of Helsinki (1990) in Finland.

== Bibliography ==
He is the author of a number of notable books:

- Russia since 1801: the making of a new society
- Russia and the Balkan Alliance of 1912
- Conservative nationalism in nineteenth-century Russia
- Russia's western borderlands, 1710-1870
- Russification in the Baltic Provinces and Finland
- Interpreting History: Collective Essays on Russia's Relations with Europe
